The following are the squads for the 2017 FIBA Asia Cup.

Group A

India

Iran

Jordan

Syria

Group B

China

Iraq

Philippines

Qatar

Group C

Kazakhstan

Lebanon

New Zealand

South Korea

Group D

Australia

Chinese Taipei

Hong Kong

Japan 
}

References

External links 
 Official website

squads
FIBA Asia Cup squads